Sarılar may refer to several places:

Iran
Sarilar, Ardabil, Iran
Sarilar, East Azerbaijan, Iran

Turkey

Sarılar, Amasya a village in Amasya central district of Amasya Province
Sarılar, Çivril a village in Çivril district of Denizli Province
Sarılar, Elmalı a village in Elmalı district of Antalya Province
Sarılar, Göynük, a village in Göynük district of Bolu Province
Sarılar, Kazan, a village in Kazan district of Ankara Province
Sarılar, Kaş, a village and neighborhood in Kaş district of Antalya Province
Sarılar, Kemalpaşa, a village in Kemalpaşa district of İzmir Province
Sarılar, Manavgat, a village in Manavgat district of Antalya Province
Sarılar, Mersin, a village in Mezitli district of Mersin Province
Sarılar, Şehitkamil a village in Şehitkamil district of Gaziantep Province
Sarılar, Sur